Stronger Than Desire is a 1939 American drama film directed by Leslie Fenton and starring Virginia Bruce, Walter Pidgeon and Ann Dvorak. It is a remake of 1934 film Evelyn Prentice, itself based on the 1933 novel 	Evelyn Prentice by W.E. Woodward. The film's sets were designed by the art director Edwin B. Willis, overseen by Cedric Gibbons.

Plot
Believing her husband Tyler has been seeing another woman, Barbara Winter, behind her back, Elizabeth Flagg begins a relationship with Michael McLain, who then blackmails her with her love letters. During a struggle for the letters, a gun goes off, McLain falls and Elizabeth flees. But police find McLain's wife, Eva, near the body and charge her with murder.

With a guilty conscience, Elizabeth asks her husband, a lawyer, to defend Eva in court. He endeavors to prove someone else did the shooting, unaware his own wife was directly involved. Eva eventually confesses, but is set free when it is determined that she acted in self-defense.

Cast

Virginia Bruce as Elizabeth Flagg
Walter Pidgeon as Tyler Flagg
Lee Bowman as Michael McLain
Ann Dvorak as Eva McLain
Ilka Chase as Jo Brennan
Rita Johnson as Barbara Winter
Richard Lane as Jerry Brody
Ann E. Todd as Susan Flagg 
Paul Stanton as Assistant D.A. Galway
Ferike Boros as Mrs. D'Amoro
King Baggot as Juror 
Barbara Bedford as Miss Watson - Flagg's Secretary 
 Leonard Carey as Albert - Flagg's Butler 
 Donald Douglas as 	Mack Clark - Flagg's Investigator 
 Margaret Bert as Sara - Susan's Nursemaid
 Alphonse Martell as 	Headwaiter
Louis Jean Heydt as Court Appointed Attorney 
 Arthur Housman as 	Reporter
 Tom Neal as 	Reporter
 Mariska Aldrich as 	Police Matron 
 Amzie Strickland as 	Flagg's Party Guest 
 Reed Hadley as Flagg's Party Guest

Reception
According to MGM records the film earned $263,000 in the US and Canada and $160,000 elsewhere, making a profit of $1,000.

References

External links

Stronger Than Desire at TCMDB

1939 films
Metro-Goldwyn-Mayer films
1939 drama films
Remakes of American films
Films directed by Leslie Fenton
Films based on American novels
American drama films
Films with screenplays by William Ludwig
American black-and-white films
1930s English-language films
1930s American films